is the second studio album by Japanese heavy metal band Loudness. It was released in 1982. The American Daniel McClendon (brother of Tommy McClendon) was called to engineer the sound of this album, because there was no Japanese technician experienced enough in heavy metal records at the time. The album won the award for Best Heavy Metal record of the year in Japan. The reissue in CD of 2005 contains two bonus tracks, coming from the second single of the band.

Track listing
All music by Akira Takasaki, all lyrics by Minoru Niihara
Side one
"Lonely Player" - 4:51
"Angel Dust" - 4:47
"After Illusion" - 5:59
"Girl" - 2:34

Side two
"Hard Workin'" - 3:30
"Loving Maid" - 4:55
"Rock the Nation" - 3:23
"Devil Soldier" - 7:08

2005 Japanese CD edition bonus tracks
"Geraldine" - 4:00
"Lonely Player" (live) - 5:02

Personnel
Loudness
Minoru Niihara - vocals
Akira Takasaki - guitars
Masayoshi Yamashita - bass
Munetaka Higuchi - drums

Production
Daiko Nagato - producer
Daniel McClendon - engineer, mixing
Kenichi Kishi, Masao Nakajima - label executives
Keisuke Tsukimitsu - art direction

References

1982 albums
Loudness (band) albums
Nippon Columbia albums
Japanese-language albums
Albums produced by Daiko Nagato